Cai Xuzhe (born May 1976) is a Chinese People's Liberation Army Astronaut Corps (PLAAC) taikonaut selected as part of the Shenzhou program.

Biography 
Cai was born in Shenzhou, Hengshui, Hebei province in 1976. He served as a fighter pilot in the People's Liberation Army Air Force, and was subsequently selected to be an astronaut in 2010. His name was revealed as part of Group 2 in 2011.

He is currently in space onboard the Tiangong space station, as part of the Shenzhou 14 mission. He has completed two spacewalks on 17 September and 17 November both with Chen Dong.

See also 
 List of Chinese astronauts

References

External links 
Taikonaut (yuhangyuan) Biography: Cai Xuzhe 

Shenzhou program astronauts
People's Liberation Army Astronaut Corps
People's Liberation Army Air Force personnel
Living people
1976 births
Spacewalkers